United Akali Dal (Muttahida Akali Dal)  is a Sikhism-centric political party floated on 22 November 2014 at Amritsar by leaders of United Sikh Movement and Insaf Lehar have played leading role in setting up this party. This party is led by Bhai Mokham Singh.

On June 25, 2020, Bhai Mokham Singh and his party members dissolved the party and merged into the new Shiromani Akali Dal (Democratic), led by Sukhdev Singh Dhindsa.

References

Political parties in Punjab, India
Sikh political parties
Amritsar
Political parties established in 2014
Political parties disestablished in 2020
2014 establishments in Punjab, India
2020 disestablishments in India
Shiromani Akali Dal